The Communauté d'agglomération des Deux Baies en Montreuillois is a communauté d'agglomération, an intercommunal structure, in the Pas-de-Calais department, in the Hauts-de-France region, northern France. It was created in January 2017 by the merger of the former communautés de communes Montreuillois, Opale Sud and Mer et Terres d'Opale. Its seat is in Montreuil. Its area is 409.1 km2. Its population was 66,119 in 2018.

Composition
The communauté d'agglomération consists of the following 46 communes:

Airon-Notre-Dame
Airon-Saint-Vaast
Attin
Beaumerie-Saint-Martin
Berck
Bernieulles
Beutin
Bréxent-Énocq
La Calotterie
Camiers
Campigneulles-les-Grandes
Campigneulles-les-Petites
Colline-Beaumont
Conchil-le-Temple
Cormont
Cucq
Écuires
Estrée
Estréelles
Étaples
Frencq
Groffliers
Hubersent
Inxent
Lefaux
Lépine
Longvilliers
La Madelaine-sous-Montreuil
Maresville
Merlimont
Montcavrel
Montreuil
Nempont-Saint-Firmin
Neuville-sous-Montreuil
Rang-du-Fliers
Recques-sur-Course
Saint-Aubin
Saint-Josse
Sorrus
Tigny-Noyelle
Le Touquet-Paris-Plage
Tubersent
Verton
Waben
Wailly-Beaucamp
Widehem

References

Agglomeration communities in France
Intercommunalities of Pas-de-Calais